Jan Béghin (7 September 1949 – 3 May 2022) was a Belgian politician for the Flemish Socialist Party (SP.A) and the Christian Democratic and Flemish (CD&V) party.

Biography
Béghin was the son of a Francophone father and a Dutch-speaking mother and spent his childhood in Ganshoren. He attended secondary school at the  before obtaining a master's degree in mathematics and in economic sciences from KU Leuven.

In 1971, Béghin was elected to the municipal council of Ganshoren as a member of CD&V. He was schepen of public works and Dutch culture from 1977 to 2000. He left the municipal council in 2005. From 1972 to 1989, he was a member of the Dutch Commission for the Culture of the Brussels Agglomeration, of which he was vice-president from 1979 to 1988, and chairman from 1988 to 1989. From 1982 to 1988, he was also director of the Contact- en Cultuurcentrum Brussel.

On 12 July 1989, Béghin became a member of the newly formed Parliament of the Brussels-Capital Region. Through his mandate in the Brussels-Capital Region Parliament, he also served in the Flemish Parliament from 1997 to 1999.

In 2004, Béghin switched to the SP.A due to the coalition between CD&V and the New Flemish Alliance, the latter of which he vehemently opposed. In 2009, he retired from the Parliament of the Brussels-Capital Region.

Jan Béghin died in Aalst on 3 May 2022, at the age of 72.

References

1949 births
2022 deaths
Members of the Flemish Parliament
Belgian politicians
Christian Democratic and Flemish politicians
Socialistische Partij Anders politicians
People from Ypres
Members of the Parliament of the Brussels-Capital Region